The black-faced grassquit (Melanospiza bicolor) is a small bird. It is recognized as a tanager closely related to Darwin's finches. It breeds in the West Indies except Cuba, on Tobago but not Trinidad, and along the northern coasts of Colombia and Venezuela.

Taxonomy
The first formal description of the black-faced grassquit was by the Swedish naturalist Carl Linnaeus in 1766 in the twelfth edition of his Systema Naturae. He introduced the binomial name Fringilla bicolor. Linnaeus based his description on the "Bahama Sparrow" that was described and illustrated by Mark Catesby in his The Natural History of Carolina, Florida and the Bahama Islands which was published between 1729 and 1732. The black-faced grassquit was traditionally placed in the genus Tiaris. A molecular phylogenetic study published in 2014 found that this genus was polyphyletic and that the black-faced grassquit was closely related to the Saint Lucia black finch in the monospecific genus Melanospiza. In the resulting reorganization of the genera, the black-faced grassquit was moved to Melanospiza.

Eight subspecies are recognised:
 M. b. bicolor (Linnaeus, 1766) – Bahamas and islands off north Cuba
 M. b. marchii (Baird, SF, 1864) – Jamaica and Hispaniola
 M. b. omissa (Jardine, 1847) – Puerto Rico, Lesser Antilles, north Colombia and north Venezuela
 M. b. huilae (Miller, AH, 1952) – central Colombia
 M. b. grandior (Cory, 1887) – San Andrés Archipelago (east of Nicaragua)
 M. b. johnstonei (Lowe, 1906) – La Blanquilla Island and the Los Hermanos Archipelago (off north Venezuela)
 M. b. sharpei (Hartert, 1893) – Netherlands Antilles
 M. b. tortugensis (Cory, 1909) – La Tortuga Island (off north Venezuela)

Description
It has a short conical black bill, a black head and breast with an olive green back. Females and immature birds have dull olive-grey upperparts and head, and paler grey underparts becoming whiter on the belly.

Males on the South American mainland have more extensively black underparts, shading to a grey belly.

The male has a display flight in which he flies for short distances, vibrating his wings and giving a buzzing  dik-zeezeezee call.

Behaviour and ecology

Breeding
This is a common bird in long grass or scrub in open or semi-open areas, including roadsides and ricefields. It makes a domed grass nest,  lined with finer grasses, and placed low in a bush or on a bank. The typical clutch is two or three whitish eggs blotched with reddish brown.

Food and feeding
The black-faced grassquit feeds mainly on seeds, especially of grasses and weeds, occasionally on fruits and berries. It also feeds on small insects, mainly during the breeding season. It is often found in small groups.

References

External links
 Xeno-canto: audio recordings of the black-faced grassquit
 Black-faced Grassquit videos, photos & sounds on the Internet Bird Collection

black-faced grassquit
Birds of the Caribbean
Birds of the Dominican Republic
Birds of Colombia
Birds of Venezuela
black-faced grassquit
black-faced grassquit